Tam Kon Shan is a hill that stands between Moon Tsai Tong and Cheung Shue Tau on Tsing Yi Island, Hong Kong. Part of the hill was removed to build the west half of the Cheung On Estate. The nearby Tam Kon Shan Road and Tam Kon Shan Interchange were named after the hill.

Tsing Yi
Mountains, peaks and hills of Hong Kong